Carrie Mary McLain (born January 26, 1895 in Astoria, New York, died 1973) was an American writer. She moved to Alaska about 1910 and taught school on the Seward Peninsula, primarily in Nome, Alaska for many years. She published two books: Gold Rush Nome and Pioneer Teacher. She died in the Palmer Pioneers Home on May 30, 1973, and was buried in Nome. The community museum in Nome is named in her honor.

See also
 Nome Gold Rush

References

1895 births
1973 deaths
Schoolteachers from Alaska
People from Astoria, Queens
People from Matanuska-Susitna Borough, Alaska
People from Nome, Alaska
Writers from Alaska
20th-century American educators
Educators from New York City
20th-century American women educators